Abatsky (masculine), Abatskaya (feminine), or Abatskoye (neuter) may refer to:
Abatsky District, a district of Tyumen Oblast, Russia
Abatskoye, a rural locality (a selo) in Abatsky District of Tyumen Oblast, Russia